Kermia cavernosa is a species of sea snail, a marine gastropod mollusk in the family Raphitomidae.

Description
The length of the shell attains 9 – 10 mm.

The shell is narrowly shouldered. The ribs are oblique, rather narrow. The shell is white, the shoulder light chestnut, with sometimes a few chestnut spots on the body whorl.

Distribution
This marine species occurs off the Philippines, Indonesia and in the Persian Gulf and Fiji Islands

References

 Reeve, Proc. Zool. Soc. Lond., 1845, p. 118

External links

 
 Li B.-Q. [Baoquan] & Li X.-Z. [Xinzheng] (2014) Report on the Raphitomidae Bellardi, 1875 (Mollusca: Gastropoda: Conoidea) from the China Seas. Journal of Natural History 48(17-18): 999-1025
 Gastropods.com: Clathurella cavernosa
 J.C. Melvill (1917), A revision of the Turridae (Pleurotomidae) occurring in the Persian Gulf, Gulf of Oman and North Arabian Sea, as evidenced mostly through the results of dredgings carried out by Mr. F. W. Townsend, 1893-1914;  Proceedings of the Malacological Society of London vol. 12, 1917  
 Schepman, 1913. The prosobranchia of the Siboga expedition. Part IV -V - VI: Toxoglossa 

cavernosa
Gastropods described in 1845